HMS Saracen was a Tribal-class destroyer of the Royal Navy launched in 1908 and sold in 1919. Originally allocated to the 1st Destroyer Flotilla, during the First World War she served in the North Sea and the English Channel with the 6th Destroyer Flotilla.

Bibliography

External links
 HMS Saracen, Index of 19th Century Naval Vessels

 

Tribal-class destroyers (1905)
Ships built on the Isle of Wight
1908 ships
World War I destroyers of the United Kingdom